Rubus inclinis is a rare North American species of flowering plants in the rose family. It is native to the northeastern United States, in the State of New York.

The genetics of Rubus is extremely complex, so that it is difficult to decide on which groups should be recognized as species. There are many rare species with limited ranges such as this. Further study is suggested to clarify the taxonomy.

References

inclinis
Plants described in 1944
Flora of New York (state)
Flora without expected TNC conservation status